Gomperz, Gompertz, Gumpertz, Gumperz, Gomperts or Gompers is a surname. Notable people with the surname include:
Aaron Solomon Gumperz (1723–1769), Jewish German scholar and physician
Benjamin Gompertz (1779–1865), British actuary, and mathematician
Gompertz function, named for Benjamin Gompertz
Don Gumpertz, sailor who circled the world on MV Westward in the 1970s
Henry Gompertz (18671930), English-born judge active in Hong Kong and the Federated Malay States.
Ian Gompertz (born 1975), English cricketer
John J. Gumperz, linguist
Julian Gumperz, German sociologist, communist activist, publicist and translator
Heinrich Gomperz (1873–1942), Austrian philosopher
Lewis Gompertz (c. 1783–1865), English inventor, writer and animal rights and veganism activist
Louis Gompertz (1886–1951), Anglo-Indian soldier and writer 
Marcia Gumpertz, American statistician
Samuel W. Gompertz (1868–1952), American showman
Sydney G. Gumpertz (1879–1971), American soldier in World War I
Theodor Gomperz (1832–1912), Moravian-Austrian philologist
Will Gompertz (born 1964), British arts journalist
Samuel Gompers (1850-1924), US labour organizer and founder of the AFL
 Dr Rebecca Gomperts (born 1966), founder of Women on Waves.

See also
 Palais Gomperz, Vienna
 Simpson Gumpertz & Heger Inc.

Jewish surnames